John Carmody may refer to:
 John Carmody (footballer), Australian rules footballer
 John M. Carmody, American administrator
 John Carmody (judge), North Dakota judge

See also
 Jack Carmody, Australian rules footballer